Haike Eva van Stralen (born 22 April 1983) is a Dutch former swimmer, who specialized in freestyle events. She is a two-time Olympian (2000 and 2004), and double Dutch short-course champion in the 200 and 400 m freestyle. Van Stralen also played for De Kempvis Swimming Club in Spijkenisse, under her personal coach Dick Bergsma.

Van Stralen made her first Dutch team, as a 17-year-old teen, at the 2000 Summer Olympics in Sydney. She placed eleventh, along with Carla Geurts, Chantal Groot, and Manon van Rooijen, in the 4×200 m freestyle relay with a time of 8:08.53.

Four years later, at the 2004 Summer Olympics in Athens, Van Stralen competed again in the women's 4×200 m freestyle relay as a member of the Dutch team. She claimed the 200 m freestyle from the Dutch National Championships in Amsterdam, posting her relay entry time of 2:02.21. Teaming with Groot, Marleen Veldhuis, and Celina Lemmen in heat two, van Stralen swam a second leg, and lowered her personal best to 2:01.80. Van Stralen and the entire Dutch team missed the top 8 final by almost two seconds, finishing only in fifth place and ninth overall with a final time of 8:08.96.

References

1983 births
Living people
Olympic swimmers of the Netherlands
Swimmers at the 2000 Summer Olympics
Swimmers at the 2004 Summer Olympics
Dutch female freestyle swimmers
People from Leusden
Sportspeople from Utrecht (province)